Frederick Petre Crowder, QC (18 July 1919 – 16 February 1999) was a British Conservative Member of Parliament and barrister.

Crowder was the son of Sir John Crowder, a Conservative Member of Parliament and predecessor as MP for Finchley of Margaret Thatcher. He was educated at Eton College and Christ Church, Oxford just as his father was before him. He served in the Coldstream Guards from 1939, in North Africa, Italy and Burma, attaining the rank of Major. He became a barrister, called by Inner Temple in 1948. He was appointed Recorder of Gravesend in 1960, chairman of the Hertfordshire Quarter sessions in 1963 and became Queen's Counsel in 1964.

Crowder contested Tottenham North in a 1945 by-election and was elected as Member of Parliament for the Conservative safe seat of Ruislip-Northwood in 1950. He served until 1979, preceding John Wilkinson.

On 12 July 1948 Crowder married Patricia Winifred Mary Stourton (1924-2007), daughter of William Stourton, 25th Baron Mowbray, by whom he had two sons.

References

External links 
 

1919 births
1999 deaths
Conservative Party (UK) MPs for English constituencies
Coldstream Guards officers
British Army personnel of World War II
Members of the Inner Temple
People educated at Eton College
UK MPs 1950–1951
UK MPs 1951–1955
UK MPs 1955–1959
UK MPs 1959–1964
UK MPs 1964–1966
UK MPs 1966–1970
UK MPs 1970–1974
UK MPs 1974
UK MPs 1974–1979